Christopher Bell Erwin (born April 26, 1962) is an American politician. He is affiliated with the Republican Party, and was elected a member of the Georgia House of Representatives in 2018. Erwin represents the 28th district, which covers the entirety of Banks County and Stephens County, as well as the eastern region of Habersham County in northeast Georgia.

Pre-political career
Before becoming a representative, Erwin was a business director for Carroll Daniel Construction Company, and a school administrator in Carroll and Henry counties. He was the superintendent of the Banks County School System for eleven years. Erwin was named Banks County Citizen of the Year in 2006, and was voted Georgia School Superintendent of the Year in 2013.

Political career 
Erwin initially defeated incumbent Dan Gasaway in a close election in the May 22, 2018 Republican primary. Gasaway challenged the results, claiming that there were votes cast outside of the district for the election. Stacey Abrams cited the election as an example of election fraud under Georgia Secretary of State Brian Kemp, her opponent in the 2018 Georgia gubernatorial election. A judge for Banks County ruled in favor of Gasaway's challenge and a special election was held on December 4, 2018. Erwin won the race by a closer margin of two votes. After being sworn in as the new representative, Erwin was temporarily removed from the House, due to a court order allowing Gasaway to challenge the results again. A final election was held April 9, 2019, in which Erwin won with 75% of the vote.

References

1962 births
Living people
Republican Party members of the Georgia House of Representatives
University of Georgia alumni
21st-century American politicians
School superintendents in Georgia (U.S. state)